Birupes is a monotypic genus of southeast Asian tarantulas containing the single species, Birupes simoroxigorum. It was first described by R. Gabriel and D. Sherwood in 2019, and it has only been found in Malaysia.

See also
 List of Theraphosidae species

References

Monotypic Theraphosidae genera
Arthropods of Borneo